Polyadenylate-binding protein 1 is a protein that in humans is encoded by the PABPC1 gene. The protein PABP1 binds mRNA and facilitates a variety of functions such as transport into and out of the nucleus, degradation, translation, and stability. There are two separate PABP1 proteins, one which is located in the nucleus (PABPN1) and the other which is found in the cytoplasm (PABPC1). The location of PABP1 affects the role of that protein and its function with RNA.

Function 

The poly(A)-binding protein (PAB or PABP), which is found complexed to the 3' poly(A) tail of eukaryotic mRNA, is required for poly(A) lengthening and the termination of translation. In humans, the PABPs comprise a small nuclear isoform and a conserved gene family of other poly(A)-binding proteins.[supplied by OMIM]

PABPC1 is usually diffused within the cytoplasm and concentrated at sites of high mRNA concentration such as stress granules, processing bodies, and locations of high translational activity. PABPC1 is also associated with nonsense-mediated mRNA decay (NMD). PABPC1 binds to the poly(A) tail and interact with eIF4G, which stabilizes the circularization of mRNAs. This structure is required for the prevention of mRNA degradation via NMD.

In the nucleus PABP1 binds to the poly(A) tails of pre-mRNAs to facilitate stability, export, transport, and degradation. PABP1 binding is also required for nuclear-mediated degradation. PABPC1 contains four RNA-recognition motifs (RRMs). The first two, RRM1 and RRM2, bind both α-importin and the poly(A) tail of processed mRNA. This feature prevents mRNA from going back into the nucleus.

Interactions 

PABPC1 has been shown to interact with:
 ANAPC5, 
 CNOT7, 
 EIF4G3,
 EIF4G1, 
 GSPT2, 
 PAIP1,  and
 PAIP2.

References

Further reading 

 
 
 
 
 
 
 
 
 
 
 
 
 
 
 
 
 
 
 

RNA-binding proteins